The Nevius Street Bridge once carried car traffic across the Raritan River between Hillsborough Township and Raritan Borough in Somerset County, New Jersey, United States. In the 1840s a wooden bridge crossed at this location.  The current  bridge was built in 1886 by the Wrought Iron Bridge Company of Canton, Ohio.  It is a double intersection Pratt truss bridge. The construction of the nearby John Basilone Veterans Memorial Bridge replaced the Nevius Street Bridge in 2005; the bridge now serves as a pedestrian bridge, connecting River Road in Hillsborough with the Raritan River Greenway.
The bridge, described using its historic name, Raritan Bridge, was added to the National Register of Historic Places on November 12, 1992 for its engineering and method of construction.

Background
Joannes Nevius was born in Zoelen, Netherlands, in 1627 and emigrated to New Amsterdam in 1651.  His grandson, Petrus or Peter Nevius, was the first with the Nevius name to come to the Raritan Valley in Somerset County.

History
The Raritan Water Power Canal is located at the north end of the bridge. The water pumping station built  by James B. Duke and the canal hydroelectric power plant are not part of the NRHP listing, but are noted in the description section.

Gallery

See also
List of bridges on the National Register of Historic Places in New Jersey
List of crossings of the Raritan River

References

Bridges completed in 1886
Road bridges on the National Register of Historic Places in New Jersey
Bridges in Somerset County, New Jersey
Hillsborough Township, New Jersey
Raritan, New Jersey
National Register of Historic Places in Somerset County, New Jersey
New Jersey Register of Historic Places
Bridges over the Raritan River
Wrought iron bridges in the United States
Pedestrian bridges in New Jersey